Sabibul Azam is a First class cricketer from Bangladesh who made his debut for  Chittagong Division in 2003/04 with little success, playing in three matches. His highest score of 15 came against Barisal Division.

See also
 List of Chittagong Division cricketers

References

Bangladeshi cricketers
Living people
Chittagong Division cricketers
Mohammedan Sporting Club cricketers
People from Rajshahi District
Year of birth missing (living people)